Len Turner is a former news anchor and reporter who appeared regularly on American local television stations from 1990–2008.

Career
From 2006–2008, he was an anchor and a reporter for News 12 New Jersey, a 24-hour all news channel in the New York City metropolitan area. From 2005–2006, he was a reporter for WTXF, the Fox Broadcasting station in Philadelphia. In 2005, he received an Emmy Award for coverage of spot news from the National Academy of Television Arts and Sciences. He also has appeared on the following U.S. television stations: KTVI, St. Louis, WPTV-TV West Palm Beach, Florida, WEAR-TV Pensacola, Florida and WUFT-TV Gainesville, Florida. His work has appeared on the following national networks: CNN, CNN Headline News, CNN.com, The Weather Channel, Fox News Channel, MSNBC.

His work has appeared on local broadcast stations via these feed services: CNN Newsource, NBC NewsChannel, ABC NewsOne, and Fox News Edge.

References

External links
 Len Turner's official biography

Living people
Year of birth missing (living people)